The Rickenbacker 360 is an electric, semi-acoustic guitar made by Rickenbacker, and part of the Rickenbacker 300 Series. The instrument incorporates many features standard on Rickenbacker guitars, including a three-ply maple/walnut neck, shallow headstock angle, a thick rosewood fretboard finished with clear conversion varnish, and double truss rods. The 360 also features stereo or mono output, a body with Rickenbacker's "crescent moon" cutaway shape and rounded top edge and bound back, and an "R"-shaped trapeze tailpiece. A twelve-string version of the 360 (Rickenbacker 360/12) is available. A three-pickup version of this model is also available, the 370.

George Harrison of The Beatles had been extensively using an earlier style 360/12 (closer resembling the 330/12 model), but retired it immediately from stage performances upon receiving the new style 360/12 (having rounded cutaways and top edge) in August 1965. The first recording by The Beatles of this new model 360/12 can be heard on the song If I Needed Someone. Roger McGuinn, of The Byrds, played a 12-string Rickenbacker 370. The six-string Rickenbacker 360 model is the principal guitar of artists such as R.E.M.'s Peter Buck and Against Me!'s Laura Jane Grace. The 360 was once produced with slanted frets for "a natural finger angle," but negative response led Rickenbacker to switch back to perpendicular frets.

Features
No. Frets: 24
Scale Length: 
Neck Width at Nut: 
Neck Width at 12th Fret: 
Crown Radius: 
Weight 
Overall Length 
Overall Width 
Overall Depth

External links
360 model information at Rickenbacker International Corporation

Rickenbacker guitars
Semi-acoustic guitars
1958 musical instruments